The 2000 Syracuse Orangemen football team represented Syracuse University during the 2000 NCAA Division I-A football season. The Orangemen were coached by Paul Pasqualoni and played their home games at the Carrier Dome in Syracuse, New York.

Schedule

References

Syracuse
Syracuse Orange football seasons
Syracuse Orangemen football